Simona Halep defeated Elena Rybakina in the final, 3–6, 6–3, 7–6(7–5) to win the women's singles tennis title at the 2020 Dubai Tennis Championships. Halep saved a match point en route to the title, against Ons Jabeur in the second round.

Belinda Bencic was the defending champion, but lost in the first round to Anastasia Pavlyuchenkova.

This tournament marked the return of former world No. 1 Kim Clijsters, who lost to Garbiñe Muguruza in the first round. It was Clijsters' first professional match since August 29, 2012.

Seeds
The top two seeds received a bye into the second round.

Draw

Finals

Top half

Bottom half

Qualifying

Seeds

Qualifiers

Lucky loser

Qualifying draw

First qualifier

Second qualifier

Third qualifier

Fourth qualifier

Fifth qualifier

Sixth qualifier

References

External links
Main draw
Qualifying draw

Women's Singles
2020 WTA Tour